Richard Wyot may refer to:
 Richard Wyot (priest, died 1463), Canon of Windsor
 Richard Wyot (priest, died 1522), Master of Christ's College, Cambridge